Fräulein Raffke is a 1923 German silent film directed by Richard Eichberg and starring Werner Krauss, Lydia Potechina and Lee Parry. A "Raffke" was Weimar era slang for a money accumulator.

The film's sets were designed by the art director Jacek Rotmil.

Cast
 Werner Krauss as Emil Raffke 
 Lydia Potechina as Emils Wife 
 Lee Parry as Lilli Raffke 
 Harry Hardt as Paul Grune 
 Vivian Gibson as Tänzerin Tatjana 
 Hans Albers as Baron 
 Heinrich Peer
 Loni Nest as Kind
 Max Grünberg as Pauls Sozius

References

Bibliography
 Bock, Hans-Michael & Bergfelder, Tim. The Concise CineGraph. Encyclopedia of German Cinema. Berghahn Books, 2009.

External links

1923 films
Films of the Weimar Republic
Films directed by Richard Eichberg
German silent feature films
German black-and-white films